Deborah Dultzin Kessler (also published as Deborah Dultzin-Hacyan) is a Mexican astrophysicist specializing in quasars, blazars, active galactic nuclei, and supermassive black holes. She is a professor and researcher in the National Autonomous University of Mexico (UNAM) Institute of Astronomy.

Education and career
Dultzin is the daughter of Arieh Dulzin, a Zionist activist from Minsk in the Russian Empire and Soviet Union (now Belarus) who emigrated to Mexico in 1928, and to Israel in 1956. Her mother was Fredzia Kessler, an oil painter from Warsaw, Poland, who had also emigrated to Mexico as a child in 1929. She was born in Monterrey in 1945, and grew up with her mother after her father left Mexico. 

As a high school student and later at UNAM, she loved mathematics but struggled with physics. Nevertheless, she completed a degree in physics in order to aim for a career in astronomy. Her anti-American political stance, and the influence of Guillermo Haro, persuaded her to continue her studies in the Soviet Union, where she went next with the support of the Ministry of Foreign Affairs. She earned a master's degree in astrophysics at Moscow State University, working with Yakov Zeldovich, but for personal reasons returned to Mexico without completing a doctorate, at that time taking a position as a researcher at UNAM.

At the suggestion of a colleague in a sabbatical visit to Paris, she compiled a doctoral thesis based on her existing published work, and defended it at the Sorbonne University in 1986. Her dissertation was Spectrophotometrie des noyaux actifs des galaxies [Spectrophotometry of active galactic nuclei], directed by Jean Heyvaerts.

Recognition
Dultzin is a member of the Mexican Academy of Sciences. She was the 2010 winner of the Ciudad Capital Heberto Castillo award. In 2016, UNAM gave her the National University Award. She is also a winner of the UNAM Sor Juana Inés de la Cruz Recognition.

In 2007, an international symposium was held in honor of her 60th birthday.

References

1945 births
Living people
People from Monterrey
Mexican people of Polish-Jewish descent
Mexican people of Belarusian-Jewish descent
Mexican astrophysicists
Women astrophysicists
National Autonomous University of Mexico alumni
Moscow State University alumni
Academic staff of the National Autonomous University of Mexico
Members of the Mexican Academy of Sciences